Jure Natek (born 30 March 1982) is a retired Slovenian handball player who competed at the 2004 Summer Olympics.

References

1982 births
Living people
Handball players from Ljubljana
Slovenian male handball players
Olympic handball players of Slovenia
Handball players at the 2004 Summer Olympics
Expatriate handball players
Slovenian expatriate sportspeople in Germany
20th-century Slovenian people